Theresa Andersson (born 11 September 1971) is a singer-songwriter and multi-instrumentalist.

History

General
Andersson came to New Orleans in 1990 to play violin with fellow singer-songwriter and Swede, Anders Osborne. Nine years later, she left the band. Since then, Andersson has performed and recorded with several well-known New Orleans musicians, including Allen Toussaint, The Neville Brothers, The Meters and Betty Harris. In 2007, she accepted an invitation to participate in Goin' Home: A Tribute to Fats Domino, where she performed "When The Saints Go Marching In" with The Preservation Hall Jazz Band. Andersson has performed on Late Night with Conan O'Brien and The Late Late Show with Craig Ferguson and has been a performer at the Voodoo Festival in New Orleans.

One-woman show
Inspired by a one-man-puppet-show (Blair Thomas, Chicago), in which the puppeteer played multiple characters and the drums, Andersson overcame the financial impracticality of touring Europe with a band by learning to play with a loop pedal. She began by looping just her violin, voice, and guitar. Wanting to create a richer sound live, however, she began thinking about adding another loop pedal and more instruments. As a result, Andersson currently travels with two loop pedals, which she uses simultaneously, along with her record player, drums, dulcimer, guitar, and violin.

Recording specifics

Hummingbird, Go! 
Andersson's idea for her most recent Basin Street Records release was borne while touring Sweden, when she met with producer Tobias Froberg. With little prodding, like-minded Tobias flew to New Orleans in the fall of 2007, where the two recorded Hummingbird, Go! in Andersson's kitchen. Andersson played most of the instruments on the album, with exception on two duets: one with New Orleans producer Allen Toussaint, and the other with Norwegian Singer Ane Brun. The album was mixed by Linus Larsson (Peter, Bjorn and John, Mercury Rev).

Theresa Andersson Live at Le Petit
In April 2010, Theresa released her first live DVD entitled Theresa Andersson Live at Le Petit. Andersson's performance at New Orleans’ Le Petit Theatre du Vieux Carre on 28 Feb was recorded for the DVD. Live at Le Petit contains an extended set of old and new music, including some exclusive, never-before-seen material. In addition to her original music, the DVD features Andersson's renditions of traditional American folk songs as well as a duet with famed New Orleans music legend Allen Toussaint.

Online success
Andersson's do-it-yourself video for her song "Na Na Na" has become very popular on YouTube, with over 1.2 million views. Originally shot as a promotional video to help music venues understand how she would be touring, the video went viral during the summer of 2008. Andersson filmed the video, and a second one for her song, "Birds Fly Away" in the same kitchen where she recorded her album Hummingbird, Go!

Personal life
Andersson is married, with one child born 2011. She skipped the 2011 New Orleans Jazz Fest because hormonal changes associated with delivery of her first child temporarily rendered her upper vocal register unsteady. Andersson and her family live in Shreveport.

Discography

Solo
 Vibes (3 June 1996)
 Theresa Andersson (30 April 2000)
 No Regrets (19 April 2002)
 Shine (10 March 2004)
 Theresa Andersson The EP (20 May 2006)
 I the River EP (11 June 2008)
 Hummingbird, Go! (2 September 2008)
 Street Parade (24 April 2012)

Compilations
 Peace Stories by Theresa Anderson, John Fohl, David Doucet  – (2001)
 A Love Song for Bobby Long by Various Artists – Soundtracks – (2005)
 When The Saints Go Marching In by Preservation Hall Jazz Band, on Goin' Home: A Tribute to Fats Domino – (2007)
 "Ladies In Blue" by David Byrne and Fatboy Slim, on Here Lies Love – (2010)

Filmography
 The Strat Pack: Live in Concert (2004)
 A Love Song for Bobby Long (2004)
 The Brooke Ellison Story (2004)
 Infidelity (2004)
 Earth vs. The Radiators: The First 25 (2004)
 New Orleans Music in Exile (2006)
 Theresa Andersson Live at Le Petit (2010)

References

External links

 
Official website for Theresa Andersson
[  Allmusic biography]
"Theresa Andersson flies solo at Jazz Fest", Chris Rose, New Orleans Times-Picayune, 30 Apr 2009

1972 births
Living people
American alternative rock musicians
Swedish emigrants to the United States
American women pop singers
Musicians from New Orleans
People from Gotland
Songwriters from Louisiana
Swedish women singer-songwriters
Swedish singer-songwriters
Singers from Louisiana
Guitarists from Louisiana
21st-century American women singers
21st-century American singers
21st-century Swedish women singers
21st-century Swedish singers
21st-century American women guitarists
21st-century American guitarists
21st-century American violinists